Giovanni della Rovere (1457 – November 1501) was an Italian condottiero.  He was a nephew of Pope Sixtus IV, and the brother of Giuliano della Rovere (1443–1513), Pope Julius II from 1503.

Biography
Giovanni della Rovere was born at Savona. In 1474, thanks to his uncle, Pope Sixtus IV, he became lord of the papal fiefs of Senigallia and Mondavio. He was also Prefect of Rome and Duke of Sora and Arce. In 1484, Pope Innocent VIII appointed him Captain-General of the Church.

He married Giovanna da Montefeltro, daughter of Federico III da Montefeltro, and some of their descendants adopted the surname Montefeltro della Rovere. Their children included  Francesco Maria I della Rovere, the first Duke of Urbino, who married Eleonora Gonzaga.

After Charles VIII of France had abandoned the Kingdom of Naples and the Aragonese had been restored there, a conspiracy was hatched against the latter at Isola di Sora, in Giovanni's territories. However, the plot was thwarted, although after it the Duchy of Sora followed a more anti-Spanish and pro-papal policy, and Giovanni led some pro-French expeditions in Campania and Abruzzo from 1494 to 1501. In 1495, he conquered Ceprano, Montecassino and the Terra Sancti Benedicti. In 1496, he defended the duchy against Prospero Colonna and Frederick IV of Naples, losing some territories, although most of them were later returned to him by Pope Alexander VI.

Giovanni della Rovere died in Rome in 1501.

See also
Duchy of Sora

Notes

References
Hollingsworth, Mary (2011): The Borgias. History's Most Notorious Dynasty. Quercus. 

1457 births
1501 deaths
Giovanni
People from Savona
15th-century condottieri
Dukes of Sora